James Wyatt  (3 August 1746 – 4 September 1813) was an English architect, a rival of Robert Adam in the neoclassical and neo-Gothic styles. He was elected to the Royal Academy in 1785 and was its president from 1805 to 1806.

Early life 
Wyatt was born on 3 August 1746 at Weeford, near Lichfield, Staffordshire, England.

Early classical career
Wyatt spent six years in Italy, 1762–68, in company with Richard Bagot of Staffordshire, who was Secretary to the Earl of Northampton's embassy to the Venetian Republic. In Venice, Wyatt studied with Antonio Visentini (1688–1782) as an architectural draughtsman and painter. In Rome he made measured drawings of the dome of St. Peter's Basilica, "being under the necessity of lying on his back on a ladder slung horizontally, without cradle or side-rail, over a frightful void of 300 feet".

Back in England, his selection as architect of the proposed Pantheon or "Winter Ranelagh" in Oxford Street, London, brought him almost unparalleled instant success. His brother Samuel was one of the principal promoters of the scheme, and it was doubtless due to him that the designs of a young and almost unknown architect were accepted by the committee. When the Pantheon was opened in 1772, their choice was at once endorsed by the fashionable public: Horace Walpole pronounced it to be "the most beautiful edifice in England".

Externally it was unremarkable, but the classicising domed hall surrounded by galleried aisles and apsidal ends was something new in assembly rooms, and brought its architect immediate celebrity. The design was exhibited at the Royal Academy, private commissions followed, and at the age of 26 Wyatt found himself a fashionable domestic architect and on 27 August 1770 an Associate of the Royal Academy. His polished manners secured him friends as well as patrons among the great, and when it was rumoured that he was about to leave the country to become architect to Catherine II of Russia, a group of English noblemen is said to have offered him a retaining fee of £1,200 to remain in their service. His major neoclassical country houses include Heaton Hall near Manchester (1772), Heveningham Hall in Suffolk (circa 1788–99),  and Castle Coole in Ireland, as well as Packington Hall in Staffordshire, the home of the Levett family for generations, and Dodington Park in Gloucestershire for the Codrington family. On 15 February 1785 Wyatt was elected an Academician of the Royal Academy, his diploma work being a drawing of the Darnley Mausoleum.

Later classical work
In later years, he carried out alterations at Frogmore for Queen Charlotte, and was made Surveyor-General of the Works. In about 1800, he was commissioned to carry out alterations to Windsor Castle which would probably have been much more considerable had it not been for the King's illness, and in 1802 he designed for the King the "strange castellated palace" at Kew which was remarkable for the extensive employment of cast iron in its construction.

Between 1805 and 1808 Wyatt remodelled West Dean House in West Dean, West Sussex. Wyatt's work was remarkable because it is built entirely of flint, even to the door and window openings, which would normally be lined with stone.

In 1776, Wyatt succeeded Henry Keene as Surveyor to Westminster Abbey (in which year he was appointed Elizabeth, Countess of Home's architect on Home House, though he was sacked and replaced by Robert Adam a year later). In 1782 he became, in addition, Architect of the Ordnance. The death of Sir William Chambers brought him the post of Surveyor General and Comptroller of the Works in 1796.

Wyatt was now the principal architect of the day, the recipient of more commissions than he could well fulfil. His widespread practice and the duties of his official posts left him little time to give proper attention to the individual needs of his clients. As early as 1790, when he was invited to submit designs for rebuilding St Chad's Church at Shrewsbury, he broke his engagements with such frequency that the committee "became at length offended, and addressed themselves to Mr. George Stewart". In 1804, Jeffry Wyatt told Farington that his uncle had lost "many great commissions" by such neglect. When approached by a new client, he would at first take the keenest interest in the commission, but when the work was about to begin he would lose interest in it and "employ himself upon trifling professional matters which others could do". His conduct of official business was no better than his treatment of his private clients, and there can be no doubt that it was Wyatt's irresponsible habits which led to the reorganization of the Board of Works after his death, as a result of which the Surveyor's office was placed in the hands of a political chief assisted by three "attached architects".

Wyatt was a brilliant but facile designer, whose work is not characterized by any markedly individual style. At the time he began practice the fashionable architects were the brothers Adam, whose style of interior decoration he proceeded to imitate with such success that they complained of plagiarism in the introduction to their Works in Architecture, which appeared in 1773. Many years later Wyatt himself told George III that "there had been no regular architecture since Sir William Chambers – that when he came from Italy he found the public taste corrupted by the Adams, and he was obliged to comply with it". Much of Wyatt's classical work is, in fact, in a chastened Adam manner with ornaments in Coade stone and Etruscan-style medallions executed in many cases by the painter Biagio Rebecca, who was also employed by his rivals. It was not until towards the end of his life that he and his brother Samuel (with whom must be associated their nephew Lewis) developed the severe and fastidious style of domestic architecture which is characteristic of the Wyatt manner at its best. But among Wyatt's earlier works there are several (e.g., the Christ Church gateway and the mausoleum at Cobham) which show a familiarity with Chambers' Treatise on the Decorative Part of Civil Architecture, and so permit the belief that if his artistic integrity had been greater Wyatt might have continued the Chambers tradition instead of falling in with the "corrupt taste" of the brothers Adam. Had he been given the opportunity of designing some great public building, it is possible that he would have shown himself a true disciple of Chambers; but his career as a government architect coincided with the Napoleonic wars, and his premature death deprived him of participation in the metropolitan improvements of the reign of George IV.

Gothic architecture

Meanwhile, Wyatt's reputation as a rival to Robert Adam had been eclipsed by his celebrity as a Gothic architect. Every Georgian architect was called upon from time to time to produce designs in the medieval style, and Wyatt was by no means the first in the field. However, whereas his predecessors had merely Gothicized their elevations by the addition of battlements and pointed windows, Wyatt went further and exploited to the full the picturesque qualities of medieval architecture by irregular grouping and the addition of towers and spires to his silhouettes. Never, indeed, have the romantic possibilities of Gothic architecture been more strikingly demonstrated than they were by Wyatt at Fonthill Abbey and Ashridge; and although crude in scale and often unscholarly in detail, these houses are among the landmarks of the Gothic revival in England. In his lifetime Wyatt enjoyed the reputation of having "revived in this country the long forgotten beauties of Gothic architecture", but the real importance of his Gothic work lay in the manner in which it bridged the gap between the rococo Gothic of the mid 18th century and the serious medievalism of the early 19th century.

Of his cathedral restorations, inspired as they were by the mistaken idea that a medieval church ought to be homogeneous in style and unencumbered by screens, monuments, and other obtrusive relics of the past, it can only be said that the Chapters who employed him were no more enlightened than their architect, and that at Westminster Abbey at least he accomplished an urgent work of repair in an unexceptionable manner. His activities at Salisbury, Durham, Hereford, and Lichfield were bitterly criticized by John Carter in his Pursuits of Architectural Innovation, and it was due in large measure to Carter's persistent denunciation that, in 1796, Wyatt failed to secure election as a Fellow of the Society of Antiquaries. In the following year, however, he was permitted to add F.S.A. to his name by a majority of one hundred and twenty-three votes.

Wyatt was elected to the Royal Academy in 1785, and took an active part in the politics of the Academy. In 1803 he was one of the members of the Council which attempted to assert its independence of the General Assembly of Academicians, and when the resultant dissensions led Benjamin West to resign the Presidency in the following year, it was Wyatt who was elected to take his place. But his election was never formally approved by the King, and in the following year he appears to have acquiesced in West's resumption of office. Wyatt was one of the founders of the Architects' Club in 1791, and sometimes presided at its meetings at the Thatched House Tavern.

In 1802 Wyatt built a new house for the 7th Earl of Bridgewater on the Ashridge estate in Hertfordshire which is now a Grade I listed building. In 1803 Thomas Johnes hired Wyatt to design Saint Michel's Hafod Church, Eglwys Newydd, in Ceredigion, Wales.

Family and death
Wyatt died on 4 September 1813 as the result of an accident to the carriage in which he was travelling over the Marlborough Downs with his friend and employer, Christopher Bethell-Codrington of Dodington Park. He was buried in Westminster Abbey.

He left a widow and four sons, of whom the eldest, Benjamin Dean, and the youngest, Philip, were notable architects. Matthew Cotes (1777–1862), the second son, became a well-known sculptor, whose best work is the bronze statue of George III in Cockspur Street off Trafalgar Square. Charles, the third son, was for a time in the service of the East India Company at Calcutta, but returned to England in 1801; nothing is known of his later career.

Pupils and employees
He had many pupils, of whom the following is an incomplete list: William Atkinson; W. Blogg; H. Brown; Joseph Dixon (perhaps a son of the draughtsman); John Foster, junior of Liverpool; J. M. Gandy; C. Humfrey; Henry Kitchen; James Wright Sanderson; R. Smith; Thomas and John Westmacott; M. Wynn; and his sons Benjamin and Philip Wyatt. Michael Gandy and P. J. Gandy-Deering were also in his office for a time.

Wyatt's principal draughtsman was Joseph Dixon, who, according to Farington, had been with him from the time of the building of the Pantheon.

List of architectural works
Wyatt's known works include the following.

Public buildings
The Pantheon, Oxford St, London, 1770–1772, demolished 1937
Christ Church, Oxford, north and east sides of the Canterbury Quad, including the gate 1773–83
Radcliffe Observatory, Oxford, 1776–94
Brasenose College, Oxford, redecorated the Library 1779–80
Holywell Music Room, Oxford, remodelled interior 1780
The Assembly Rooms, Chichester, Sussex, 1783
Worcester College, Oxford, interiors of the chapel and hall 1783, the chapel was redecorated by William Burges
Royal Arsenal, Woolwich, various buildings for the Board of Ordnance, 1783–1807
Oriel College, Oxford, the library and alterations to the provost's rooms 1788–91
Liverpool Town Hall, interiors 1783–1813
New College, Oxford, alterations to the Hall, Chapel & Library 1789–94
Merton College, Oxford, rebuilt Hall 1790–1794, again rebuilt by Sir George Gilbert Scott 1872-4
Lincoln's Inn, London, repairs to the chapel roof 1791
Balliol College, Oxford, rebuilt hall and redecorated the library 1792
Magdalen College, Oxford, alterations to the hall and chapel 1792-5
Royal Military Academy, Woolwich, 1796–1805
Royal Artillery Barracks, Woolwich, 1796-7
Palace of Westminster, restoration of the House of Lords 1800–1813, burnt 1834
Ripon Town Hall, Yorkshire, 1801
The King's Bench Prison, London, restoration and alterations 1803–1804, demolished
The Marshalsea Prison, London, restoration and alterations 1803–1805, demolished
Fenham Barracks, Newcastle upon Tyne, 1804–1806
The Naval Arsenal, Great Yarmouth, Norfolk 1806, demolished 1829
The Armoury, Shrewsbury 1806
The Royal Military College, Sandhurst, Berkshire, 1807–12 executed by John Sanders who modified the design, most notably using Greek Doric for the portico
Dorset House, Whitehall, London, adaptation as government offices 1808, demolished
The Market Cross, Devizes, Wiltshire, 1814

Churches
St. James Church, in the planned community of Milton Abbas, Dorset, 1774–86
St. George's Chapel, Windsor Castle, alterations 1787–1790
Salisbury Cathedral, restoration work 1787–93
St. Peter's Church, Manchester, 1788–94, demolished
Lichfield Cathedral, restoration 1788–95
Hereford Cathedral, restoration 1788–97
Milton Abbey, Dorset, restored Abbey church 1789–91
East Grinstead Church, Sussex 1789–1813
Durham Cathedral, restoration 1795-6
St. Kea Church, Cornwall, 1802 demolished 1895
Westminster Abbey, London, restoration work 1803
Hafod Church, Caernarvonshire, 1803, burnt down 1931
Weeford Church, Staffordshire, 1803
Henry VII Lady Chapel, Westminster Abbey, restoration 1807–13
Hanworth Church, Middlesex, 1808–13, rebuilt 1865

London houses
11–15 Portman Square, London, 1774
House, Grosvenor Square London, 1778-9
9 Conduit Street, London, 1779
Richmond House, London, addition of two rooms and staircase 1782, burnt down 1791
1 Foley Place, London, 1783, James Wyatt's own house, demolished 1925
Lichfield House, 15 St. James Square, London, alterations to the drawing room 1791-4
Montague House, 22 Portman Square, London, additions 1793, bombed in Blitz 1940
Queen's House (Buckingham Palace), London, alterations, rebuilt by John Nash 1825–1830
22 St. James Square, London, 1803
Old Palace Kew, London, repairs 1802–11
New Palace Kew, London, 1802–11, never completed owing to George III's insanity, demolished 1827-8
Devonshire House, London, the crystal staircase 1811–12, demolished 1924
Carlton House, London, refitted library 1812, demolished

New country houses
Abbeyleix House, Co. Laois, Ireland 1773
Gaddesden Place, Hertfordshire, 1768–73
Heaton Hall, Lancashire, 1772
Sheffield Park, Sussex, 1776
Farnham House, Cavan, extended by Francis Johnston, 
Grove House, Roehampton, 1777
Bryanston House, Dorset, 1778 rebuilt by Richard Norman Shaw, 1890
Hothfield Place, Kent, 1778–80, demolished 1954
Badger Hall, Shropshire, 1779–1783 demolished 1952
Roundway House, Wiltshire, 1780
Fornham Hall, Suffolk, 1781–1782, demolished 1951
Lee Priory, Kent, 1782–1790, demolished 1954, a room survives in the V&A Museum
New Park, Roundway, Devizes, Wiltshire, 1783, demolished 1955
Sudbourne Hall, Suffolk, 1784, later extended and remodelled
Sunningdale Park, Berkshire, 1785, rebuilt
Wynnstay House, Denbighshire, 1785–1788, rebuilt in the 19th century
Stanstead Park, Sussex, 1786–1791, rebuilt in 1900
Sufton Court, Herefordshire, 1788
Ammerdown House, Kilmersdon, Somerset, 1788
Gresford House, Denbighshire, c. 1790
Hartham Park, Wiltshire, 1790-1795
Castle Coole, County Fermanagh, 1790-1798
Frogmore House, Berkshire, 1792
Sundridge Park, Kent, 1792–1795, finished by John Nash
Henham Hall, Suffolk, 1793–1797, demolished 1953
Purley Park, Berkshire, 1795
Bowden House, Bowden Hill, Wiltshire, 1796
Fonthill Abbey, Wiltshire, 1796–1813
Trentham Hall, Staffordshire, 1797, remodelled by Sir Charles Barry, demolished 
Stoke Poges Park, Buckinghamshire, 1797–1802
Wycombe Abbey, Buckinghamshire, c.1798
Dodington Park, Gloucestershire, 1798–1808
Norris Castle, Isle of Wight, 1799
Pennsylvania Castle, Dorset, 1800
Cranbourne Lodge, Windsor great Park, 1800, demolished 1830
Nacton House, Suffolk, 1801
Belvoir Castle, Leicestershire, 1801–1813, work continued under Rev. T. Thornton after Wyatt's death
West Dean Park, Sussex, 1804, enlarged 1893
Ashridge, Hertfordshire, 1808–1813, completed by his nephew Sir Jeffry Wyatville after Wyatt's death
House at Streatham Surrey, 1810
Elvaston Castle, Derbyshire, 1812

Garden buildings and follies
Folly, Temple Island, 1771
Bridge, Chiswick House, attributed, 1774
Cobham Hall, Kent, Darnley Mausoleum, 1783
Brocklesby Park, Lincolnshire, the Mausoleum, 1787–94 
Broadway Tower, an isolated folly for Lady Coventry, 1794
Peper Harrow, Surrey, a conservatory 1797, demolished 
Croome Park, Worcestershire, various garden buildings including the Panorama Tower, 1801

Alterations to country houses
Fawley Court, Oxfordshire, internal alterations 1771
Cobham Hall, Kent, alterations and additions, 1771–81, 1789–93, 1801–12
Crichel House, Dorset, interior alterations 1773
Charlton Park, Wiltshire, alterations 1774
Aubery Hill, Notting Hill, London, alterations 1774
Shardeloes, Buckinghamshire, alterations to library, and garden buildings (demolished) 1774
Copped Hall, Essex redecoration of Library, burnt out in 1917
Milton Abbey, Dorset, interior decoration 1775-6
Belton House, Lincolnshire, Library & Boudoir 1776-7
Burton Constable Hall, Yorkshire, West Drawing Room & Entrance Lodges, 1776-8
Heveningham Hall, the interiors & orangery, plus the Rectory & Huntingfield Hall (a farm) 1776–84
Blagdon Hall, Northumberland, internal alterations 1778, Lodges to park 1787 & stables 1789–91
Ragley Hall, Warwickshire, alterations and interiors 1780
Sandleford Priory, Berkshire, alterations and additions 1780-6
Pishobury Park, Hertfordshire, reconstruction of an older house after a fire 1782-4
Plas Newydd, Anglesey, alterations & enlargements 1783–95 and 1811
Gunton Hall, Norfolk, enlargement 1785, partially demolished
Leinster House, Dublin, decoration of the gallery 1785
Cremore House, Chelsea, alterations 1785–1788, demolished
Goodwood House, Sussex, enlargements, kennels & dower house, 1787–1806
Powderham Castle, addition of music room 1788
Soho House, Birmingham, alterations, additions and interiors 1790s
Felbrigg Hall, Norfolk, alterations 1791–1804
Auckland Castle, County Durham, Gothic screen, inner gateway, processional route, Chapel, and Throne Room c.1795
Corsham Court, Wiltshire, alterations 1796
Cricket St Thomas, Somerset, alterations 1796–1800
Windsor Castle, Berkshire, alterations and interiors 1796–1800
Canwell Hall, Staffordshire, added wings and interiors, 1798, demolished 1911
Swinton Park, Yorkshire, North Wing 1798
Cassiobury House, Hertfordshire, alterations & additions 1799
Wilton House, Wiltshire, alterations 1801–11
Bulstrode Park, Buckinghamshire, 1807, rebuilt by Benjamin Ferrey 1862
Swinton Park, Yorkshire, south wing 1813
Chicksands Priory, Bedfordshire, alterations 1813–14
Draycot House Draycot Cerne, Wiltshire, design for a ceiling and bracket for a bust by Joseph Wilton 1784

Drawings
Few original drawings by Wyatt are known to be in existence: but in the RIBA library there are designs by him for Badger Hall, Fonthill Abbey, Downing College, and Ashridge Park. The Royal Academy has drawings for the mausoleums at Brocklesby Park and Cobham Hall. An album of Wyatt's sketches, in the possession of the Vicomte de Noailles, contains designs for chandeliers, torchères, vases, etc., a plan for Lord Courtown, etc. Those for Slane Castle are in the Murray Collection of the National Library of Ireland.

Portrayals
There is a portrait in the RIBA library, and a pencil portrait by George Dance is in the Library of the Royal Academy. The National Portrait Gallery has a bronze bust of Wyatt by John Charles Felix Rossi.

See also
 Wyatt family

Footnotes

References
   (1954): A Biographical Dictionary of English Architects, 1660–1840, Harvard, pp. 722 and onwards. 
   (2012): Woolwich – Survey of London, Volume 48, Yale Books, London.  (online text)

External links

 
 
 James Wyatt's biography at Beckfordiana, the website for resources on the life and work of William Beckford of Fonthill.
James Wyatt & the Palace of Westminster - UK Parliament Living Heritage
 Packington Hall, Home of Rev. Thomas Levett, Whittington, Staffordshire, ca 1900

18th-century English architects
British neoclassical architects
Deaths by horse-riding accident in England
1746 births
1813 deaths
Royal Academicians
Road incident deaths in England
Burials at Westminster Abbey
People associated with Sandleford, Berkshire
Architects from Staffordshire
James